Strachotice is a municipality and village in Znojmo District in the South Moravian Region of the Czech Republic. It has about 1,000 inhabitants.

Administrative parts
The village of Micmanice is an administrative part of Strachotice.

References

Villages in Znojmo District